Nickelodeon is a French pay television channel, working as the local variant of US kids network Nickelodeon in France, as well as to other French-speaking countries such as of Switzerland, Belgium, Luxembourg, Monaco, Lebanon, Francophone Africa, & Haiti. The network has two sister networks, Nickelodeon Junior and Nickelodeon Teen.

The network is solely branded as "Nickelodeon" in Francophone regions, with the common branding shortening of "Nick" used in all other markets completely unused, as "Nick" is too similar to the French swear word niquer.

History 

On 10 January 2003, Nicktoons was launched as programming block in France on Canal J

The French variant of Nickelodeon was announced in 2005, and was officially launched on 16 November of that same year. The channel's application to broadcast on the French digital terrestrial television was rejected by the CSA in favour of Gulli, a kids-oriented state-owned channel. It gains revenue through advertisement and product sells. At the time, its market value was equal to €300 million. According to a research conducted by ConsoJunior in 2006, Nickelodeon France was the most watched channel among kids between 4 and 14 years old. During this time, the channel premiered new shows such as SpongeBob SquarePants, Avatar: the Last Airbender and Dora the Explorer. Thereafter, during the first half of 2007, Nickelodeon increased its audience share by 113% over a year. Due to this, some French celebrities such as Matt Pokora started to appear on the channel as hosts.

On 26 January 2010, Nickelodeon France adopted the new logo and rebranded its graphical package. On that same day, the preschool channel Nickelodeon Junior was launched. In November of that same year, the network celebrated its fifth anniversary. On 20 September 2011, it switched its aspect ratio from 4:3 to 16:9. In May 2013, Nickelodeon announced the release of 2 new videogames of Dora the Explorer, in association with 2K Games.

From 28 June to 12 July 2013, the channel organised the Crazy Tour Nickelodeon on six malls in France. On 6 September 2014, Nickelodeon France premiered Rabbids Invasion, an original series of the channel.

On 19 November 2014, Nickelodeon 4Teen was launched, with its programming being centred on series for teenagers. It rebranded to Nickelodeon Teen in 2017. On 22 September 2015, Nickelodeon HD was launched. In March 2016, Nickelodeon +1 was launched, replacing the timeshift feed of MTV, MTV +1. In 2019, Nickelodeon channels were launched on French ISP bouquets, ending their exclusivity on Canal+. In January 2021, Nickelodeon, J-One and Comedy Central were added to the Mauritius Telecom's My.t offers.

Sister channels

Nickelodeon Junior

Nickelodeon Junior is now a separate 24-hour digital television channel.

Nickelodeon Teen

Nickelodeon 4Teen was launched on 19 November 2014, broadcasting in HD and focusing on live-action shows for a female audience.

On 26 August 2017, the channel was rebranded as Nickelodeon Teen.

N-Toons

Nicktoons was a block on the French network Canal J. On 1 November 2005 the block ended.

In 2012, a block named N-Toons aired on Nickelodeon, premiering animation shows.

Current programming
 Game Shakers
 Henry Danger
 Instant Mom
 It's Pony
 Kamp Koral: SpongeBob's Under Years
 Max & Shred
 Nicky, Ricky, Dicky & Dawn (19 June 2015 – present)
 Rabbids Invasion
 SpongeBob SquarePants
 Taffy
 Rainbow Butterfly Unicorn Kitty
 Rise of the Teenage Mutant Ninja Turtles
 The Fairly OddParents
 The Loud House
 The Thundermans
 The Casagrandes
 Middlemost Post
 The Patrick Star Show
 Rugrats (2021)

See also
 List of Nickelodeon international channels
 Nickelodeon Switzerland, German-speaking Swiss version in Switzerland

References

External links 
 Official website
 Nickelodeon Junior France 

France
Television channels and stations established in 2005
Television stations in France
Television stations in Switzerland
French-language television in Switzerland
Television stations in Morocco
Television stations in Lebanon
Television stations in Tunisia
2005 establishments in France
French-language television stations